Vylar Kaftan is an American science fiction and fantasy writer. A Clarion West Workshop graduate, she lives on the U.S. West Coast.

Kaftan's short story "Civilisation" is included in Farah Mendlesohn's anthology Glorifying Terrorism, and several of her other speculative fiction flash and short stories have also been published. Her short story "I'm Alive, I Love You, I'll See You In Reno", published in the June 2010 issue of Lightspeed Magazine, was a nominee for the 2010 Nebula Award for Best Short Story.

Her novella "The Weight of the Sunrise", published in the February 2013 issue of Asimov's Science Fiction, won the 2013 Nebula Award for Best Novella and the Sidewise Award.; it also was a nominee for the 2014 Theodore Sturgeon Award. Her novella "Her Silhouette, Drawn In Water", published May 21, 2019 by Tor.com, was a nominee for the Nebula Award for Best Novella.

Bibliography

See also the list of stories on her website, with links.

Short fiction

References

External links
 Vylar Kaftan official website
Author's online archive of her short fiction including her Nebula-winning "The Weight of the Sunrise"

Year of birth missing (living people)
Living people
21st-century American short story writers
American science fiction writers
American short story writers
American women short story writers
Asimov's Science Fiction people
Nebula Award winners
Sidewise Award winners
Women science fiction and fantasy writers
21st-century American women writers
Grinnell College alumni